Deji Deji Nikki 100 Kai Kinen! Ayumi Hamasaki Bon or Ayu no Deji Deji Nikki is a photobook by Japanese pop singer Ayumi Hamasaki. It was released on 7 April 2009. It includes Hamasaki's diary entries from ViVi magazine that she kept from 2001 until 2009. It also includes an interview and photos of her in a white bikini on a beach. The photobook is the first of its kind debut at Number 1 on the Oricon Book Charts with well over 100,000 copies sold.

References 

Ayumi Hamasaki
J-pop
Books of photographs
2009 non-fiction books